Kiki Bertens and Johanna Larsson were the defending champions, but withdrew from their first round match.

Lesley Kerkhove and Lidziya Marozava won the title, defeating Eugenie Bouchard and Kirsten Flipkens in the final, 6–7(4–7), 6–4, [10–6].

Seeds

Draw

Draw

References
 Draw

2017 Doubles
BGL Luxembourg Open – Doubles
2017 in Luxembourgian tennis